Robert Fox may refer to:

 Robert Were Fox the Elder (1754–1818), Falmouth businessman, father of Robert Were Fox the Younger
 Robert Were Fox the Younger (1789–1877), English geologist and natural philosopher, father of Barclay Fox
 Robert Fox (antiquarian) (1798–1843), English antiquarian
 Robert Barclay Fox (1873–1934), Falmouth businessman and Conservative Cornish politician, grandson of Barclay Fox
 Robert Fox (activist) (1846–?), 19th-century African-American civil rights activist
 Robert Bradford Fox (1918–1985), Philippine historian
 Robert J. Fox (1927–2009), Roman Catholic priest and author from South Dakota
 Robert J. Fox (pastor) (1930–1984), associate pastor and activist from The Bronx
 Robert Fox (footballer) (born 1931), Australian rules footballer
 Robert Fox (historian) (born 1938), historian of science
 Robert Fox (producer) (born 1952), English theatre and film producer
 Bob Fox (architect) (born 1941), New York City architect
 Robert Fortescue Fox (1858–1940), British physician and surgeon
 Toby Fox (born 1991), game developer

See also 
 Bob Fox (disambiguation)